The Tatapani is a large coal field located in the east of India in Jharkhand. Tatapani represents one of the largest coal reserve in India having estimated reserves of 2.65 billion tonnes of coal.

References 

Coalfields of India
Mining in Jharkhand